Iceland competed at the 1992 Summer Olympics in Barcelona, Spain.

Competitors
The following is the list of number of competitors in the Games.

Results by event

Athletics

Men
Field events

Badminton

Handball

Men's team competition
The Icelandic handball team had a difficult time getting to the 1992 Summer Olympics. Due to the Yugoslavian civil war and the exclusion of the Yugoslavian team from the event, Iceland received a late ticket to the Barcelona Games. With a short preparation, the team was not favored going into the Olympics, but ended up in the semi-finals. They ended up in fourth place; Kristján Arason played on the Icelandic team.

Preliminary round (group A)
 Iceland – Brazil 19-18
 Iceland – Czechoslovakia 16-16
 Iceland – Hungary 22-16
 Iceland – South Korea 26-24
 Iceland – Sweden 18-25
Semi Finals
 Iceland – Unified Team 19-23
Bronze Medal Match
 Iceland – France 20-24 (→ Fourth place)
Team roster
Gunnar Andrésson
Bergsveinn Bergsveinsson
Gústaf Bjarnason
Sigurður Bjarnason
Héðinn Gilsson
Valdimar Grímsson
Gunnar Gunnarsson
Guðmundur Hrafnkelsson
Patrekur Jóhannesson
Júlíus Jónasson
Konráð Olavsson
Sigmar Óskarsson
Birgir Sigurðsson
Einar Sigurðsson
Jakob Sigurðsson
Geir Sveinsson
Head coach: Þorbergur Aðalsteinsson

Judo

Men's 78 kg
 Freyr Gauti Sigmundsson

Men's 95 kg
 Bjarni Friðriksson

Men's +95 kg
 Sigurður Bergmann

Shooting

Men's 50 m rifle prone
 Carl Johan Eiriksson

Swimming

Women

References

sports-reference

Nations at the 1992 Summer Olympics
1992
Summer Olympics